Honky Tonk Highway may refer to

Honky Tonk Highway refers to the Broadway Historic District (Nashville, Tennessee)
Honky Tonk Highway (song) Luke Combs song

See also
Honky Tonk Freeway 1981 American-British comedy film
Highways and Honky Tonks album by Heather Myles